Wickliffe is an unincorporated community in Clarke County in the U.S. state of Virginia.

Unincorporated communities in Clarke County, Virginia
Unincorporated communities in Virginia